The Mosquito is a 1954 West German drama film directed by Walter Reisch and starring Hilde Krahl, Margot Hielscher and Gustav Knuth. It was entered into the 1955 Cannes Film Festival. It was shot at the Tempelhof Studios in West Berlin and the Wansbek Studios in Haburg. The film's sets were designed by the art director Rolf Zehetbauer.

Plot

Cast
 Hilde Krahl as Vilma
 Margot Hielscher as Jeanette
 Gustav Knuth as Karrari
 Bernhard Wicki as Hugo
 Walter Janssen as Lotsch
 Herbert Wilk as Sekretär
 Blandine Ebinger as Frau von Felde
 Isolde Hinz as Mimi
 Ingeborg Christiansen as Ertha
 Carl Voscherau as Fremdenführer
 Axel Monjé
 Charlotte Ander

References

Bibliography 
 Reimer, Robert C. & Reimer, Carol J. The A to Z of German Cinema. Scarecrow Press, 2010.

External links

1954 films
1950s spy drama films
German spy drama films
West German films
1950s German-language films
German black-and-white films
Films directed by Walter Reisch
Films set in Hamburg
Films shot at Tempelhof Studios
Films shot at Wandsbek Studios
1954 drama films
1950s German films